"Rescue Me" is a rhythm and blues song first recorded and released as a single by Fontella Bass in 1965.  The original versions of the record, and BMI, give the songwriting credit to Raynard Miner and Carl William Smith, although many other sources also credit Bass herself as a co-writer.  It would prove the biggest hit of Bass's career, reaching #1 on the R&B charts for four weeks and placing at #4 on the Billboard Hot 100. "Rescue Me" also peaked at #11 on the UK Singles Chart.

Original recording
According to writer Robert Pruter in his book Chicago Soul, the song emerged from a songwriting and rehearsal, or "woodshedding", session at Chess Records: " 'Rescue Me' was a terrific example of the Chess studio system at its finest... One Saturday in August 1965, Bass was sitting in a rehearsal studio with producers-writers Carl Smith and Raynard Miner.  They were fooling around with the song when arranger Phil Wright walked in, and the ensuing four-way jam session brought forth 'Rescue Me'.  [Billy] Davis produced the side..."  Bass claimed that, although Smith, Miner and Davis had assured her that her contribution to authorship of the song's lyrics would be acknowledged, this was never done.

Bass recorded the song in three takes at Chess Studios in Chicago. Minnie Riperton provided background vocals, and Maurice White and Louis Satterfield, later of Earth, Wind & Fire, were on drums and bass respectively.  Other musicians on the record included Pete Cosey and Gerald Sims on guitar, Leonard Caston (later a producer at Motown) on piano, Sonny Thompson on organ, and Charles Stepney on vibes.  According to Bass, the call-and-response moans heard in the song's fade were unintentional. In an interview with The New York Times in 1989, she said, “When we were recording that, I forgot some of the words... Back then, you didn’t stop while the tape was running, and I remembered from the church what to do if you forget the words. I sang, ‘Ummm, ummm, ummm,’ and it worked out just fine.”

Chart history

Weekly charts
Fontella Bass

Shirley Eikhard

Cher

Melissa Manchester

Gail Dahms

Sass Jordan

Nu Generation

Year-end charts

Accolades
The information regarding accolades attributed to "Rescue Me" is adapted from acclaimedmusic.net.

(*) designates lists that are unordered.

Other versions
 Shirley Eikhard put the song onto the Canadian Pop and AC charts in 1974.
 In 1974, Cher released it as a single, that was recorded for the album Dark Lady. Allmusic reviewed her version by calling it a good cover choice and noted that it is always good to hear her voice in classics.  She reached #82 in Canada.
 In 1976, Melissa Manchester remade "Rescue Me" for her Better Days and Happy Endings album; released as a single the track reached #78 on the Billboard Hot 100, the only Hot 100 showing for the song since the original version.
Sass Jordan recorded it for the soundtrack of the 1989 film American Boyfriends; her version reached #44 on the Canadian singles chart.
 Pat Benatar added her rendition in 1994 for the soundtrack to the film Speed.
 The song was covered by Nu Generation in 1999 and peaked at #8 on the UK charts and #29 in Ireland.
In 2019, David Solomon released a dance/electronic version of the song featuring Glee star Alex Newell.

Clear Channel memorandum
"Rescue Me" was one of the songs deemed inappropriate by Clear Channel following the September 11, 2001 attacks.

In other media
The original version of "Rescue Me" was used in a TV advertising campaign by American Express: Fontella Bass has stated that she was at a low point in her life when on New Year's Day 1990 she was astonished to hear her own voice singing "Rescue Me" on the American Express television ad.  The experience gave Bass the inspiration to set her life in order: it also motivated her to make queries over the commercial use of her recording of "Rescue Me" with the ultimate result a 1993 settlement with American Express and its advertising agency awarding Bass $50,000 plus punitive damages.
It has also been used in the films In the Army Now, A Cinderella Story, Air America, Best, I, Robot, Jumpin' Jack Flash and Sister Act. The concluding commercials for the theatrical promotion campaign for the 1994 action film, Speed, used excerpts of the song. The Pat Benatar version was also used in the trailer for Muppets From Space.

See also
List of number-one R&B singles of 1965 (U.S.)

References

External links
 
 

1965 singles
1975 singles
1976 singles
Cher songs
Linda Ronstadt songs
Elkie Brooks songs
1965 songs
Chess Records singles
MCA Records singles